Exelberg Telecommunication Tower is a  tall tower built of reinforced concrete on Exel Mountain near Vienna, Austria. Exelberg Telecommunication Tower is used for directional radio services.

See also
 List of towers

References

Buildings and structures in Vienna
Radio masts and towers in Europe
Towers in Austria